Milan Lukač (Serbian Cyrillic: Милан Лукач; born 4 October 1985) is a Serbian professional footballer who plays as a goalkeeper for Partizan.

Club career
Lukač started his career in the team FK Mladost from Bački Jarak, with whom he competed in Serbian League Vojvodina. Season 2004/05. he played for OFK Žarkovo in Serbian League Belgrade, after which he played two years for FK Srem in Serbian First League. In the highest rank, Serbian SuperLiga, he made his debut in the 2007/08 season as a goalkeeper of Čukarički. During the summer of 2009, he signed a contract with AEK Athens. In two years in the Greek club, he played in only one competitive game, on November 5, 2009 against BATE Borisov (2:2) in the group stage of the Europa League.

In the summer of 2011, Lukač signed with OFK Beograd. He spent two seasons at Karaburma, making 64 competitive appearances for the club. In June 2013, Lukač moved to Partizan, penning a three-year deal. He started the 2013/14 season. as the first goalkeeper of the Black-Whites, playing in the qualification matches for Champions League against Armenian club Shirak and Bulgarian Ludogorets. In the game with Ludogorets, he was injured, after which he was absent from the field for six weeks. After recovering from injury, Lukač was a reserve for Vladimir Stojković until the end of the first part of the championship. Stojković left the club in the winter transfer window, after which Lukač took the place of the first goalkeeper. On 146-th Eternal derby, played on April 26, 2014, Lukač saved two penalty kicks against Red Star, first to Miloš Ninković and then Nikola Mijailović. In the end, Partizan won with a score of 2:1, and Lukač became only the second goalkeeper to save two penalties in Eternal derby (the first was Ratomir Dujković at the 43rd Eternal derby in 1970). In the next 2014/15. season, Partizan won the title in Serbian SuperLiga and Lukač had the status of the first goalkeeper during the autumn part of the championship, while in the spring part his place was taken by Živko Živković. In this season, Lukač also played in the group stage of Europa League with Partizan. He played in all the matches of Group C in which the opponents of the Belgrade club were Tottenham, Beşiktaş and Asteras Tripolis. In two years he spent at Partizan, Lukač played in a total of 46 competitive matches (29 championship, 16 European and one cup match).

In July 2015, he signed a three-year contract with Turkish club Akhisar Belediyespor. He spent the next six years in the Turkish club, playing 104 league games. In the first four seasons with the club, he played in the highest rank, Süper Lig, and the last two in the second tier of the competition. On 10 May 2018, Lukač helped Akhisar Belediyespor win their first professional trophy, the 2017–18 Turkish Cup.

International career
Lukač made his international debut for Serbia in a friendly match against Brazil on 6 June 2014, coming on as a substitute for Vladimir Stojković in the 89th minute. He managed to save a header from Jô in the second minute of injury time.

Career statistics

Honours
Partizan
 Serbian SuperLiga (1): 2014–15

Akhisarspor
 Turkish Cup (1): 2017-18

References

External links
 
 
 Srbijafudbal profile
 

1985 births
Living people
Footballers from Novi Sad
Serbian footballers
Serbia international footballers
Serbian expatriate footballers
Association football goalkeepers
Serbian SuperLiga players
Super League Greece players
Süper Lig players
FK Čukarički players
AEK Athens F.C. players
FK Partizan players
FK Srem players
OFK Beograd players
Akhisarspor footballers
Serbian expatriate sportspeople in Greece
Expatriate footballers in Greece
Expatriate footballers in Turkey